Bulat-Batır or Bulat-batyr (Russian: Була́т-Баты́р, Tatar: بولات باتر) is a 1928 silent historical drama film, believed to be the first Tatar film and probably the only Tatar full-length feature silent film. The film was shot mostly in Kazan, and the Kazan Kremlin was one of its stills. The film is devoted to the Pugachev rebellion and its alternative names include Pugachyovshchina, Flames on Volga and Revolt in Kazan.

The story was written by Abdraxman Şakirov, a young Communist from Agryz and the script was written by Natan Zarhi, a Soviet scenario writer.

Plot
In the 18th century, a small Tatar village celebrates the Sabantuy festival. Orthodox monks accompanied by soldiers appear to forcibly baptize the population of the village. Locals resist and soldiers commit a punitive action. The wife of peasant Bulat is killed by soldiers, his son Asfan is carried off. Bulat stays alone with another son, Asma. 15 years after Bulat and Asma joined the Pugachev rebellion and Bulat became famous as a defender of paupers. But his son Asfan, who was reared among nobles, received a commission and led a punitive force directed to suppress a rebellion in his motherland.

Cast
Vasiliy Yaroslavtsev as Bulat-Batır
Ada Vojtsik as Asma
Ivan Klyukvin as Asfan
Galina Kravchenko as Elena von Brandt
Naum Rogozhin as von Kanits
Ivan Arkanov as Suleiman Murza
Nikolai Vitovtov as Derzhavin
Alexandr Zhukov as Timur
Boris Yurtsev as Murat
Eduard Kulganek as general Potyomkin
Mstislav Kotelnikov as Beloborodov, emissary of Pugachov
Tatyana Barysheva as genius of victory
Kayum Pozdnyakov
Lev Ivanov as Kayum
Stepan Borisov as Yemelyan Pugachev

Critical reception

It is known that after the premiere in Germany one White émigré Antonov-Ivanov attempted to burn a copy of the film in the "Concordia" cinema as a sign of protest against "Bolshevik Propaganda".

The film received a positive review from The New York Times praising it for the authentic atmosphere. Bryher praised the scenery and the cinematography.

References

External links

  Кино-Театр.РУ
  "Республика Татарстан". Восемьдесят ярких страниц истории

1928 films
Tatar culture
Soviet silent feature films
Soviet black-and-white films
Soviet historical drama films
1920s historical drama films
1928 drama films
Silent drama films